Anthony Martin is a professional escape artist, locksmith and Christian Evangelist most known for his daredevil skydiving and underwater escapes on network television.

Early Anthony
Todd Anthony Martin is of German Russian descent and was born March 4, 1966, in Sheboygan, Wisconsin U.S.A. His great grandfather fled Russia just prior to the Russian Revolution. He is the first of two children born to David and Georgene Martin. Born to a working-class family in a Midwestern town, Anthony began his career without the advantages of financial backing or theatrical connections. His early beginnings and news clippings indicate an unusually early effort to document and substantiate his escapes which has since become the cornerstone of his career.  His first police substantiated escape was at the age of 12 while still in elementary school. He currently offers a reward to anyone who can prove he resorts to the use of any fake locks or handcuffs.

Philosophy/Credentials
Martin adheres to a purest philosophy in regards to his work and rejects the use of trick or altered locks to achieve his escapes.  This philosophy resulted in his exposing on his ABC Network Television Special some of the tricks used by magicians to perform their escapes.

Martin is a member of several locksmithing organizations and is a bonded locksmith. He has acted as security consultant for both Folger Adam (detention equipment) and U.S. Department of Homeland Security. The escape artist is also responsible for having written several technical articles for a leading locksmith publication. As time allows he services and opens antique safes when not performing.

School of Hard Locks
The escape artists most notable jail escapes include over a dozen documented challenges of all steel cell blocks.  He has escaped from cells that have held such infamous crime figures as Baby Face Nelson and Edward Gein of "Psycho" fame. The Gein jail escape presented him with the task of circumventing 6 sets of handcuffs and 6 prison doors to reach freedom. His subsequent appearances in Ripley's Believe It Or Not have been translated into 17 languages worldwide.

Escape or Die
Anthony's most dangerous stunts include a successful escape from a locked box thrown out of an airplane at 15,000 feet.
The aerial box escape required the escapist to free himself from a falling coffin, skydive away from it and open his parachute before impacting the ground. He freed himself at 6500 feet to accomplish the harrowing ordeal.

The frigid winters of Wisconsin helped to provide another unique test for the daredevil when he was locked in a steel cage lowered beneath the ice of a water filled quarry. Chainsaws had to be used to cut a hole in the ice to create an entrance point for the steel cage. Locks were removed from their original factory packaging to secure the cage. One minute and forty five seconds later Anthony emerged from his would be watery grave.

For the Discovery Channel he leaped shackled over the Snake River Canyon and parachuted to safety on the north rim. Untested since Evel Knievels stunt, the Snake River Canyon presented Anthony with unusual wind and turbulence concerns. He had to free his hands in freefall in order to deploy his parachute. The handcuffs used in the attempt were purchased by the Jerome County Commissioners Office, verified by a locksmith and secured in a vault prior to the attempt.

For the ABC Television Special "Secrets of the Worlds Greatest Escape Artist" he was buried alive at the Las Vegas Hilton and escaped from beneath 2000 pounds of desert sand. The restraints used in all these escapes were verified by certified bonded locksmiths.

Besides having his own network special he has appeared on: Good Morning America, A Current Affair, Dick Clark Presents, The Late Show and many others. His television appearances have been aired in over 40 countries. His first television appearance was at the age of 13.

On August 6, 2013, Martin was handcuffed, chained and locked inside a plywood box (coffin) that was released out of an airplane at 14,500 feet. The successful event occurred over Serena in northern Illinois.

Ambassador in Chains
In recent years he has been using his talents to evangelize and promote his Christian beliefs.  Ambassador In Chains ministries was launched in 1998 as a ministry tool for local churches. Anthony uses his escapes as a metaphor for escaping eternal death through repentance and faith in Jesus Christ.

Martin is the author of the book "Escape or Die an escape artist unlocks the secret to cheating death" which was released in 2013.

References

External links
Official Website

Escapologists
1966 births
American people of German-Russian descent
Living people
People from Sheboygan, Wisconsin
Writers from Wisconsin